The 1953–54 Yugoslav Ice Hockey League season was the 12th season of the Yugoslav Ice Hockey League, the top level of ice hockey in Yugoslavia. Six teams participated in the league, and Partizan have won the championship.

Regular season

External links
 Season on hrhockey

Yugo
Yugoslav Ice Hockey League seasons
1953–54 in Yugoslav ice hockey